Lyman Lloyd Bryson (July 11, 1888 – November 24, 1959) was an American educator, media advisor and author known for his work in educational radio and television programs for CBS from the 1930s through the 1950s.

Biography

Born in Valentine, Nebraska, and educated at the University of Michigan, Bryson was a frequent guest on the radio game show Information, Please. Bryson served as a professor at Teachers College, Columbia University from 1934 to 1953.

Bryson chaired the Adult Education Board for CBS Radio, moderating such programs as The American School of the Air and Invitation to Learning. From 1938 to 1946 he hosted the public affairs program, The People's Platform, which was adapted for television (1948–1950).

Bryson died November 24, 1959, at age 71.

Literature 
 Bryson, Lyman (1948). Autobiographical essay in

References

External links

Lyman Bryson at the Old Time Radio Researchers Group

1888 births
1959 deaths
20th-century American educators
University of Michigan alumni
People from Valentine, Nebraska
CBS Radio